The 2017 CS Nebelhorn Trophy was a senior international figure skating competition held in September 2017 in Oberstdorf, Germany. It was part of the 2017–18 ISU Challenger Series. It also served as the final qualification event for the 2018 Winter Olympics. Medals were awarded in the disciplines of men's singles, ladies' singles, pair skating, and ice dance.

Entries 
The International Skating Union published the preliminary list of entries on 27 August 2017:

Result

Men

Ladies

Pairs

Ice dance

References

Citations

External links 
 2017 Nebelhorn Trophy at the International Skating Union
 2017 Nebelhorn Trophy at the Deutsche Eislauf-Union

CS Nebelhorn Trophy
Nebelhorn Trophy